Maidan is a scenic valley in the Lower Dir District of the Khyber Pakhtunkhwa province of Pakistan. The inhabitants of Maidan are Pashtuns. The most numerous tribe living in Maidan is ismailzai or Samelzai one of the four clans of Tarkani also called Tarkalani, Maidan was not directly under controlled by Pakistan government at the time of partition, the valley was governed by a Nawab named "Nawab Shah Jehan" worked as a separate state named "Royal State of the Dir" till the 1960s. In 1961, Maidan came directly under the Government of Pakistan. The main bazaar of Maidan Valley is Kumbar. There is a rural health centre situated at Lal Qilla.  Kumbar is the main business center of the valley. The valley passes through high mountains that are covered with snow in the winter season.

Maidan is known for its lush green mountains and springs in the summer season. Kumber, being the capital village of Maidan valley, is a big trading centre comprising many commercial markets. People from various villages of the Valley come to Kumbar Bazaar daily to fulfill their needs. Most of the population of valley go abroad for earning their livings.

Tehsil Maidan has recently been declared a subdivision which comprises on five Union Councils namely Lal Qilla, Kotkay, Bashigram, Zaimdara and Gal. There are two police stations in Maidan, namely Lal Qilla and Zaimdara.

The people of Maidan are highly educated compared to other parts of the District, and most of them have served the district, Mr. ghulam nabi worked a lot for education but it is regretted to say that so far there is no government colleges for females in Maidan. A man named Malak Rehman Ullah worked for female education and built a private educational institute for girls, the Rayyan Education System. Rayyan Education System offers the valley girls a cheap education from prep to High standard school (college). Students receive higher education in the other Districts of the Province or in the expensive Degree College Timergara.

Religions, language and peoples

The peoples of Maidan are Pashtuns and they speak Pashto language. They are all Sunni Muslims.

Early Maidan

Early Maidan was under the Nawab rule.

Crops
Wheat, maize, rice and Walnut are common in the region.

Politics
The politics of Maidan Dir lower arise day by date and the people contributed more and more. Four main parties participate in politics: JI, PPP, ANP and PTI. Jumat Islami had won the provisional assembly seat till date except in the 2008 election as they had boycotted the GE. PTI won the election in 2018 and Malak Liaqat Ali became a MPA and Bashir Khan MNA of Madian.

References 

Baroon

Lower Dir District
Populated places in Lower Dir District